Hobb may refer to:

Places
 Hobb Lake, Winslow Township, New Jersey, USA; a reservoir
 Hobb's Hill, Bodmin Moor, Cornwall, England, UK; a torr, see List of geographical tors

Facilities and structures
 Hobb Hotel, a 19th-century landmark in Woodland, Washington State, USA

People

Surname
 Robin Hobb (born 1952) U.S. author

Given name
 "Hobb", a diminutive form for Robert (name)
 Hobb Wilson (1904-1977) Canadian hockey player

Fictional characters
 Edwin Hobb (fictional character) computer scientist on the 2015 UK TV series HUM∀NS
 Graham Hobb (fictional character) from the 1979 UK TV series The Omega Factor, see List of The Omega Factor episodes
 Walter Hobb (fictional character) from the horror franchise Friday the 13th, see List of Friday the 13th characters
 The Hobbs (Hobb Family) from the musical comedy Kreepy Hallow, by playwright The Kreep
 Hobb (fictional character) from the 1993 TV series Cadillacs and Dinosaurs (TV series)
 Hobb (anthropomorphic mole) from the novel series The Mistmantle Chronicles, see List of The Mistmantle Chronicles characters

Other uses
 "Hobb" (1993 song), a single by UK band C Cat Trance

See also

 
 Bob (disambiguation)
 Hob (disambiguation)
 Hobbe (disambiguation)
 Hobbism
 Hobbs (disambiguation)
 Rob (disambiguation)
 Robert (disambiguation)